Paul Doherty may refer to:

 Paul C. Doherty (born 1946), British author, educator, lecturer and historian
 Paul Doherty (Gaelic footballer), inter-county goalkeeper for Galway